N'Goné Fall (born 1967) is a Senegalese curator, editor, cultural consultant and academic. She has been appointed General Commissioner of "Season Africa 2020", a French initiative to view the world from an African perspective. From 1994 to 2001, she edited Revue Noire, an African contemporary art magazine. She has served as a consultant to governments on cultural policies and has curated cultural exhibitions in Africa, Europe and the United States.

Biography
Born in Dakar, Senegal, in 1967, N'Goné Fall studied architecture under Paul Virilio (1932–2018) at the École Spéciale d'Architecture in Paris, graduating when she was 26. She did not however pursue a career in architecture as in 1992 she met the art critic Jean-Loup Pivin (born 1951) who persuaded her to join his African-oriented Revue Noire. She became its editorial director from 1994 to 2001, covering African artists on the international scene. In 2001, together with Pivin she published Anthologie de l'art africain du XX siècle, subsequently translated into English as An anthology of African art: the twentieth century.

As an independent curator and educator, she was assistant professor for the Cultural Industries Master programme at the Senghor University in Alexandria, Egypt (2007–2011). More recently she has lectured at the Michaelis School of Fine Art in South Africa (2017) and at the Abdou Moumouni University in the Niger (2018). Among the exhibitions she has curated are the Bamako Photography Encounters (2001) and the Dakar Contemporary Art Biennial (2002). In 2016, she participated in the Danish project "When things fall apart" at the Trapholt Museum in Kolding.

References

External links
Illustrated portrait from Institut français 

1967 births
Living people
People from Dakar
École Spéciale d'Architecture alumni
Senegalese architects
Senegalese editors
Senegalese women writers
Senegalese curators
Art critics
Senegalese women curators